The 1998 FIVB Women's World Championship was the thirteenth edition of the tournament, organised by the world's governing body, the FIVB. It was held from 3 to 12 November 1998 in Tokyo, Tokuyama, Matsumoto, Kagoshima, Nagoya, Fukuoka, and Osaka, Japan.

Qualification

Source:Official website

Squads

Venues

Source:

Format
The tournament was played in three different stages (first, second and final rounds). A single round-robin format was played within each group to determine the teams' group position, the three best teams of each group (total of 12 teams) progressed to the next round.

The four best teams of each group (total of 8 teams) progressed to the next round (group winners and runners-up to 1st–4th place semifinals and group thirds and fourths to 5th–8th place semifinals).

The  was played in a single elimination format and consisted of two sets of semifinals and finals (one to determine 1st–4th places and the other for 5th–8th places).

For the tournament's final standings, teams which did not reach placement matches were allocated as:
 The four teams finishing 4th in each  pool were ranked 13th.
 The two teams finishing 6th in each  pool were ranked 11th.
 The two teams finishing 5th in each  pool were ranked 9th.

Pools composition
The drawing of lots took place on 20 April 1998 in Tokyo, Japan. Teams were seeded in the first two positions of each pool following the Serpentine system according to their FIVB World Ranking. FIVB reserved the right to seed the hosts as head of Pool A regardless of the World Ranking. All teams not seeded were drawn to take other available positions in the remaining lines. The number after the team's name reflect its FIVB World Ranking in October 1998.

Results
All times are Japan Standard Time (UTC+09:00).

First round

Pool A
Venue: National Yoyogi Stadium, Tokyo

|}

|}

Pool B
Venue: Tokuyama City Sports Center, Tokuyama

|}

|}

Pool C
Venue: Matsumoto City Gymnasium, Matsumoto

|}

|}

Pool D
Venue: Kagoshima Arena, Kagoshima

|}

|}

Second round
The results and the points of the matches between the same teams that were already played during the first round are taken into account for the second round.

Pool E
Venue: Nagoya Rainbow Hall, Nagoya

|}

|}

Pool F
Venue: Marine Messe Fukuoka, Fukuoka

|}

|}

Final round
Venue: Osaka Chuo Gymnasium, Osaka

5th–8th places

5th–8th semifinals

|}

7th place match

|}

5th place match

|}

Finals

Semifinals

|}

3rd place match

|}

Final

|}

Final standing

Awards

 Most Valuable Player
  Regla Torres
 Best Scorer
  Barbara Jelic
 Best Spiker
  Ana Fernández
 Best Blocker
  Regla Torres
 Best Server
  Elles Leferink

 Best Digger
  Hiroko Tsukumo
 Best Setter
  Fernanda Venturini
 Best Receiver
  Hiroko Tsukumo
 Best Coach
  Antonio Perdomo
 Most Creative Coach
  Nobuchika Kuzuwa

References

External links
 Results - todor66
 Results
 Results - volleyball.org
 Federation Internationale de Volleyball

W
V
V
FIVB Volleyball Women's World Championship
November 1998 sports events in Asia
Women's volleyball in Japan